XHIN-FM is a radio station on 95.3 FM in Culiacán, Sinaloa. It is owned by Radiorama and carries its La Plakosa Grupera format.

History
XHIN received its concession on November 28, 1988.

References

Radio stations in Sinaloa